Raúl Godoy (born 16 November) was a former member of the provincial legislature in Neuquén Province in Argentina. He works in FaSinPat (ex Zanon), a ceramist factory in Argentina controlled democratically by his workers since 2001. He is a revolutionary and trotskyst leader. 

He is a member of the Socialist Workers' Party and a former general secretary of the ceramists' workers' union.

He was elected as a deputy for the Workers' Left Front in 2011.  He held a seat which the front is rotating between four people, he replaced Alejandro López in December 2012, and was replaced by Angélica Lagunas in December 2013.

External links 
report including video of him taking seat (Spanish)
report on him taking seat (English)
report on recent intervention with video (Spanish)

Living people
Socialist Workers' Party (Argentina) politicians
People from Neuquén Province
Argentine trade unionists
Year of birth missing (living people)